This is a list of diplomatic missions of Dominica, excluding honorary consulates. Dominica's embassy and mission to the European Union in Brussels and its embassy in Morocco is shared with other East Caribbean states.

Africa
 
 Rabat (Embassy)

Americas

 Havana (Embassy)

 Washington, D.C. (Embassy)
 New York City (Consulate)

Asia

 Beijing (Embassy)

 Abu Dhabi (Embassy)

Europe

 Brussels (Embassy)

 London (High Commission)

Multilateral organisations
 Brussels (Mission to the European Union)
 New York City (Permanent Mission to the United Nations)
 Washington, D.C. (Permanent mission to the OAS)

Gallery

See also
 Foreign relations of Dominica
 Visa policy of Dominica

References

External reference

 Diplomatic missions of Dominica

Diplomatic missions
Dominica